Edmund Beckett Denison may refer to:
Sir Edmund Beckett, 4th Baronet (1787–1874), who was known by this name 1816–1872
Edmund Beckett, 1st Baron Grimthorpe (1816–1905), son of the above, earlier known as Sir Edmund Beckett, 5th Baronet, lawyer and architect